Robert Joce is a former British slalom canoeist who competed in the 1980s.

He won two medals in the C-2 team event at the ICF Canoe Slalom World Championships with a gold in 1981 and a bronze in 1983.

References
Overview of athlete's results at canoeslalom.net

British male canoeists
Living people
Year of birth missing (living people)
Medalists at the ICF Canoe Slalom World Championships